Ramón Chíes y Gómez de Riofranco (13 October 1845 – 1893) was a Spanish journalist, editor, and political activist. Best known for his support for anti-clerical and republican positions, Chíes was an early proponent of Spanish Freethought as well as an advocate of the right to vote and the eight-hour working day.

Biography
Chíes was born in the municipality of Medina de Pomar, Burgos in 1846, and studied the sciences, philosophy, and law in Santander and Madrid before selecting journalism as his professional focus. Following the success of the Glorious Revolution in 1868, Chíes took part in the formation of the Federal Republican Party the same year.

Chíes was the editor of El voto nacional (The National Vote) and founded the weekly Las dominicales del Libre Pensamiento (The Sundays of Freethought) with Fernando Lozano in 1882. As editor of the Dominicales, Chíes was prosecuted for blasphemy and condemned to six months' imprisonment and a heavy fine, but was acquitted on appeal after a significant effort to reverse the ruling.

Shortly before his death in 1893, Chíes was elected a member of the council of the municipality of Madrid; in this capacity he proceeded to advocate that the Spanish workers be granted the eight-hour day.

References

1846 births
1893 deaths
Freethought writers
People from the Province of Burgos
Spanish republicans
Spanish politicians
Spanish activists
Spanish journalists
People prosecuted for blasphemy
19th-century journalists
Male journalists
19th-century male writers